Khawaja Sheraz Mehmood (born 6 August 1974) is a Pakistani politician who was a member of the National Assembly of Pakistan from 2002 to 2013 and again from August 2018 till January 2023.

Early life
He was born on 6 August 1974.

Political career
He was elected to the National Assembly from Constituency NA-171 (Dera Ghazi Khan-I) as a candidate of the Pakistan Muslim League (Q) (PML-Q) in the 2002 general election. He received 82,310 votes and defeated Amjad Farooq Khan.

He was re-elected to the National Assembly from Constituency NA-171 (Dera Ghazi Khan-I) as a candidate of PML-Q in 2008 Pakistani general election. He received 39,628 votes and defeated Amjad Farooq Khan. In the same election, he ran for the seat of the Provincial Assembly of the Punjab from Constituency PP-240 (Dera Ghazi Khan-I) as a candidate of PML-Q but was unsuccessful. He received 11,155 votes and lost the seat to Sardar Mir Badshah Qaisrani. In May 2011, he was inducted into the federal cabinet of the prime minister, Yousaf Raza Gillani, and was appointed minister of state for production, a post he held until June 2012. In June 2012, he was inducted into the federal cabinet of prime minister Raja Pervaiz Ashraf and was re-appointed as minister of state for production until March 2013.

He ran for the National Assembly from Constituency NA-171 (Dera Ghazi Khan-I) as a candidate of Pakistan Peoples Party (PPP) in the 2013 general election but was unsuccessful. He received 57,276 votes and lost the seat to Amjad Farooq Khan.

He was re-elected to the National Assembly as a candidate of Pakistan Tehreek-e-Insaf (PTI) from Constituency NA-189 (Dera Ghazi Khan-I) in the 2018 general election.

External Link

More Reading
 List of members of the 15th National Assembly of Pakistan

References

Living people
1974 births
Pakistani MNAs 2008–2013
Pakistani MNAs 2002–2007
Pakistani MNAs 2018–2023